Diploglena proxila is a species of araneomorph spider in the family Caponiidae.

Description 
Diploglena proxila has two eyes. The male holotype measures  and the female paratype measures .

Distribution 
The species is endemic to the Western Cape of South Africa.

References 

Caponiidae
Endemic fauna of South Africa
Spiders of South Africa
Spiders described in 2015